Chhoti Bahu is a 1971 Hindi film. Produced by Seeru Daryani and Darius Gotla, the film is directed by K. B. Tilak and written by Raj Baldev Raj.

The film stars Sharmila Tagore, Rajesh Khanna, Nirupa Roy and I. S. Johar. The music is by Kalyanji Anandji. The film was successful at the box office.

It is a remake of 1956 Telugu film Muddu Bidda, also produced and directed by K. B. Tilak which was based on the Bengali novel Bindur Chhele written by the famous Bengali author Saratchandra Chatterjee. This film is counted among the 17 consecutive hit films of Rajesh Khanna between 1969 and 1971, by adding the two-hero films Marayada and Andaz to the 15 consecutive solo hits he gave from 1969 to 1971.

Plot 
Radha (Sharmila Tagore) was the only daughter of a rich merchant. She suffers from epilepsy, triggered especially by the removal of a little doll she always carries with her. Madhu (Rajesh Khanna) was a young doctor, practicing in a village. He lives along with his older brother Shriram (Tarun Bose) and sister-in-law Sita (Nirupa Roy). A local unqualified medical practitioner, whose business got a big hit by the practice of Madhu, begrudgingly arranges a match between Madhu and Radha, hiding her illness. Madhu marries her without knowing the problem she has.

Immediately after the wedding, Madhu and his family members come to know of Radha's illness and they accept her as wedding has already taken place. After seeing that Radha's attack subsided with the touch of Gopi (son of Shriram and Sita), Sita lets her have him herself. Radha feels so happy and starts taking care of Gopi as her own son.

Years pass and Gopi, now seven years old, grows up thinking of Radha as his mother. Things go well till Madhu and Shriram's sister Paro comes along with her husband and son to stay with them. Her son Niku (Mehmood Jr.), with his playful attitude, spoils Gopi too, much to the worry of Radha. Later, Paro starts misunderstandings between Radha and Sita, that go to a bigger level because of Radha's innocence and Sita's indolence. Moreover, Paro frightens little Gopi that if he sees his mother, she would die. Frightened Gopi stays away from Radha, much to the agony of Radha. Gradually, she falls ill and her condition becomes critical. While everyone is puzzled by Gopi's behavior, Niku carefully extracts the reason for his behavior. He tells that to everyone. Everyone scolds Paro and convinces Gopi that his mother wouldn't die if he talks to her. Gopi comes to Radha and her illness goes away. Even bitterness between Radha and Sita goes away and they start living together happily as before.

Cast
Sharmila Tagore as Radha
Rajesh Khanna as Madhu
Shashikala as Paro
Nirupa Roy as Sita
I. S. Johar as Premnath (Niku's dad)
Sarika as Gopi
Mehmood Junior as Niku
Master Suraj		
Tarun Bose as Shriram
Shivraj as Radha's Father
P. Jairaj as Rajaram Ramprasad Bahadur
Satyendra Kapoor as Vedji Avtar
Radhika Rani		
Irshad Panjatan as Servant		
Chandrima Bhaduri as Ganga
Master Ratan

Soundtrack

References

External links 
 

1971 films
1970s Hindi-language films
Films based on works by Sarat Chandra Chattopadhyay
Films based on Indian novels
Films scored by Kalyanji Anandji
Hindi remakes of Telugu films
Films directed by K. B. Tilak